Starkov may refer to:

 Stárkov, a town in the Czech Republic
 Starkov (surname)